The Cable Car Museum is a free museum in the Nob Hill neighborhood of San Francisco, California. Located at 1201 Mason Street, it contains historical and explanatory exhibits on the San Francisco cable car system, which can itself be regarded as a working museum.

Exhibits

The museum contains several preserved cable cars, together with smaller exhibits and a gift shop. The cable cars displayed include:

 Sutter Street Railway - grip car 46 and trailer 54 dating from the 1870s
 Clay Street Hill Railroad - grip car 8, the only surviving car from the first cable car company

The museum is part of the complex that also houses the cable car power house, which drives the cables, and the car depot ("barn"). The car depot is not open to the public, but two galleries allow visitors to view the power house from above, and to descend below the junction of Washington and Mason streets to view the large cavern where the haulage cables are routed via large sheaves out to the street.

The museum was established in 1974, and is run by the Friends of the Cable Car Museum. The entrance is at Washington and Mason and the museum is open from 10 AM to 6 PM between April 1 and September 30 and from 10 AM to 5 PM between October 1 and March 31, apart from some public holidays. The museum main level is wheelchair accessible via a separate entrance.

References

External links

Cable Car Museum
Nob Hill, San Francisco
Railroad museums in California
San Francisco Designated Landmarks
Transportation in San Francisco
Street railway museums in the United States